Jaime H. Barlucea Maldonado (born February 14, 1971) is a Puerto Rican politician and the former mayor of Adjuntas. Barlucea is affiliated with the New Progressive Party (PNP) and served as mayor from 2005 till 2021.

Early years and studies

Jaime H. Barlucea Maldonado was born in Ponce on February 14, 1971. His parents are Jaime Barlucea Ortíz and Rosa María Maldonado Alvarez.

Barlucea completed a Bachelor's degree in Political Science and Public Administration from the Pontifical Catholic University of Puerto Rico.

Public service

Barlucea served as Regional Director of Fomento Cooperativo in Ponce. He also served as Special Aide for the President of the Commission on Public Service, among other positions.

Political career

Barlucea began his political career serving as member of the Municipal Assembly of Adjuntas. In 2004, he ran for mayor of the city, defeating incumbent Roberto Vera Monroig. After that, Barlucea was reelected three times (2008, 2012 and 2016). He won the 2020 PNP primaries, but lost the election to PPD candidate José Soto Rivera.

Personal life

Barlucea has three daughters: Jamie, Michelle, and Chelsie.

References

Living people
1971 births
Mayors of places in Puerto Rico
Politicians from Ponce
Pontifical Catholic University of Puerto Rico alumni
New Progressive Party (Puerto Rico) politicians
People from Adjuntas, Puerto Rico